Bagheli (Devanagari: बघेली) or Baghelkhandi is a Central Indo-Aryan language spoken in the Baghelkhand region of central India.

Classification

An independent language belonging to the Eastern Hindi subgroup, Bagheli is one of the languages designated as a 'dialect of Hindi' by the Indian Census Report of 2001. More specifically, it's a dialect of Awadhi, which itself defends from Ardhamagadhi. Bagheli is a regional language used for intra-group and inter-group communication. 

George Abraham Grierson  in his Linguistic Survey of India classified Bagheli under Eastern Hindi. The extensive research conducted by local specialist Dr. Bhagawati Prasad Shukla is commensurate with Grierson's classification. Ethnologue cites Godwani, Kumhari and Rewa as dialects of Bagheli. According to Shukla, the Bagheli language has three varieties:

 Pure Bagheli
 West-Mixed Bagheli
 Southern-Broken Bagheli

Like many other Indo-Aryan languages, it has often been subject to erroneous, arbitrary, or politically-motivated designation as a dialect, instead of a language. Furthermore, as is the case with other Hindi languages, Bagheli speakers have been conflated with those of Standard Hindi in censuses.

Geographical distribution 

Bagheli is primarily spoken in the Rewa, Satna, Sidhi, Singrauli, Shahdol, Umaria, Anuppur districts of Madhya Pradesh and in some parts of  Prayagraj and Chitrakoot districts of Uttar Pradesh and also Baikunthpur of Chhattisgarh.

Popular culture 

The Pao, a scheduled tribe also known as the Pabra, speak Bagheli as their first language. Their language was mistakenly reported to be Tibeto-Burman by Ethnologue, perhaps due to confusion with the Pao language of Burma.

There are several radio and TV programmes in Bagheli. All India Radio is broadcasting Bagheli songs and agricultural programmes from Shahdol, Rewa and Bhopal. Furthermore, courses pertaining to Bagheli literature are available to be studied at Awadhesh Pratap Singh University, Rewa.

Further reading
 Pathak, R. S. The Phonetics of Bagheli: A Phonetic and Phonological Study of a Dialect of Hindi. New Delhi: National Pub. House, 1980.
 Shukla, Hira Lal. Contrastive Distribution of Bagheli Phonemes. Raipur: M.P., Alok Prakashan, 1969.
 Shukla, Bhagvati Prasad. 1972. Bagheli Bhasha aur sahithya (Hindi). Allahabad: Sahitya bhavan Pvt. Ltd
 Koshy, Binoy; Tutum Padung and GB Amar. 2004. A Sociolinguistic study of Bagheli speakers in Madhya Pradesh. Unpublished research by NLCI

References

External links

Hindi languages